Acanthobrama tricolor, or the Damascus bream,  is a species of freshwater fish in the family Cyprinidae. It is endemic to Syria and the Golan Heights, and is recently only known two specimens found in the Masil al Fawwar river system in the late 1980s. It has been extirpated from the Barada river system, where it has not been seen since 1908. It is considered Critically Endangered, and may possibly be extinct, but no studies of the river systems in the Golan Heights have been conducted, and it may still survive there, but the lower Barada is now dry, and the middle portions of the river are heavily polluted.

References

tricolor
Fish described in 1883
Fish of Syria
Endemic fauna of Syria
Critically endangered animals